Todd Grattan (born 7 September 1986), nicknamed "Cougar", is an Australian professional baseball player for the Sydney Blue Sox of the Australian Baseball League.

Career
He has played with the Blue Sox since 2010 as a relief pitcher. In his first season with the team in 2010, he played in eight games, going 1-0 with a 3.15 ERA. Grattan also played college baseball in Texas and played professionally in Japan.

References

External links
, or ABL

1986 births
Living people
Australian expatriate baseball players in Japan
Australian expatriate baseball players in the United States
Baseball pitchers
Sportsmen from New South Wales
Sydney Blue Sox players